= Geuserberg =

Mountain in Germany

Coordinates: 50°14′55″N 11°27′49″E

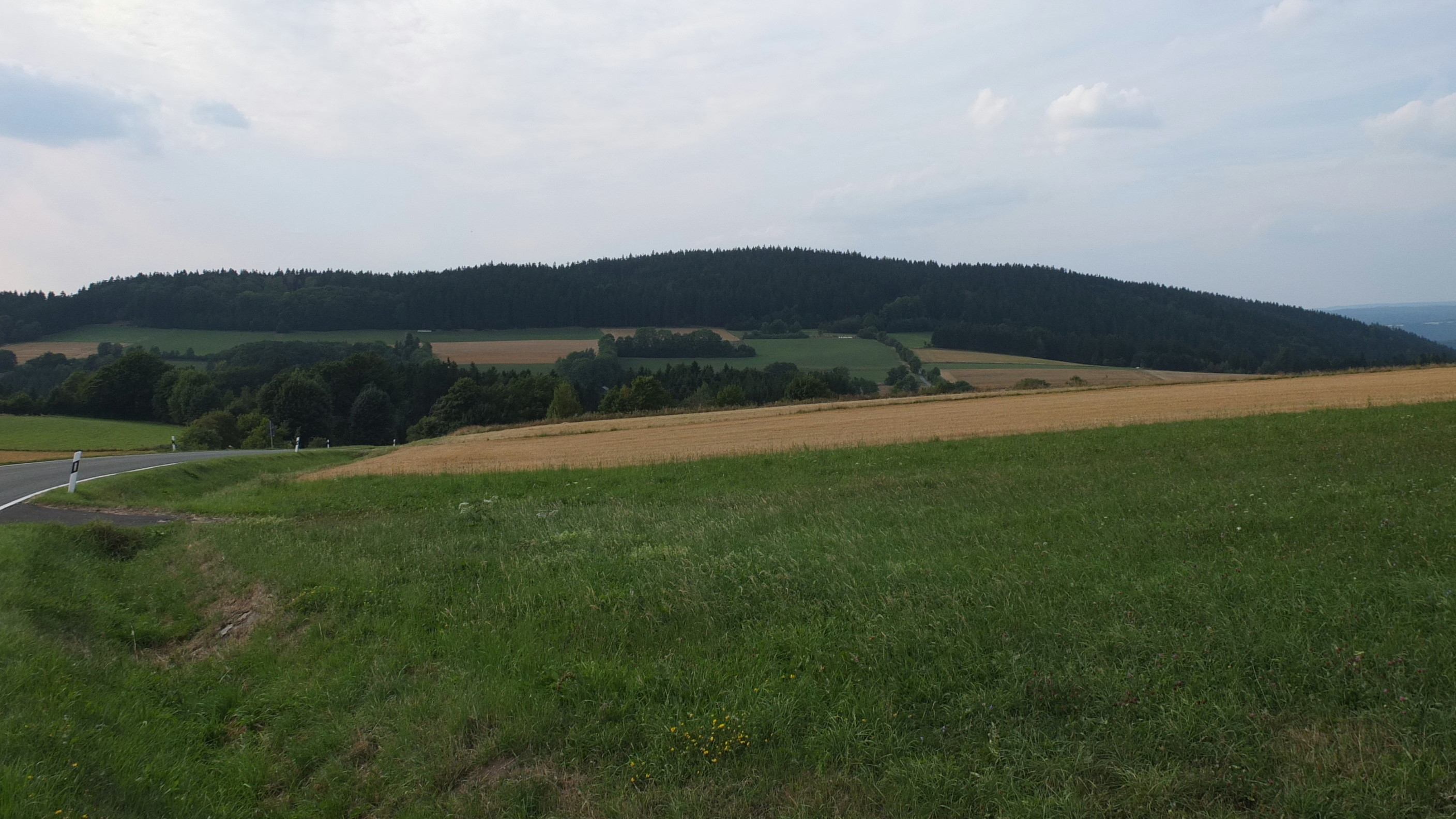

Highest point
- Elevation: 708 m (2,323 ft)

Geography
- Location: Bavaria, Germany

Geuserberg is a mountain of Bavaria, Germany.
